Equestrian at the 2013 Southeast Asian Games in Naypyidaw, Myanmar was held between December 12–18. Six events took place, all being staged at Wunna Theikdi Equestrian Field.

Medal summary

Medal table

Medalists

References

 
2013 Southeast Asian Games events
2013
Southeast Asian Games
Equestrian sports competitions in Myanmar